USS Albacore has been the name of more than one United States Navy ship, and may refer to:

, a patrol vessel in commission from 1917 to 1919
, a fleet submarine commissioned in 1942 and sunk in 1944
, an experimental test platform submarine in commission from 1953 to 1972

United States Navy ship names